My Husband and I is a British sitcom starring Mollie Sugden and William Moore that aired on ITV from 9 January 1987 to 20 May 1988. It was written and created by Pam Valentine and Michael Ashton.

Background
Following the end of That's My Boy, the writers Pam Valentine and Michael Ashton wrote a new sitcom for Mollie Sugden titled My Husband and I, which co-starred William Moore, Sugden's real-life husband.

Like That's My Boy, it was also made by Yorkshire Television.

Cast
Mollie Sugden - Nora Powers
William Moore - George Powers
Deddie Davies - Bambi Bamber
Carol Hawkins - Tracy Cosgrove
John Horsley - Mr Munday
Isabelle Lucas - Pearl
Roberta Tovey - Samantha
Natasha Gray - Anita
Jane Ashton - Henrietta

Plot
Nora Powers is the head of personnel at Ashvale Advertising. However, when Nora's retired husband George joins Ashvale Advertising as chief commissionaire, she soon gets very embarrassed.

Episodes

Series 1 (1987)

Christmas Special (1987)

Series 2 (1988)

DVD releases
A single episode of My Husband and I has been released by the Network imprint on a DVD entitled Classic ITV Christmas Comedy.

References
Mark Lewisohn, "Radio Times Guide to TV Comedy", BBC Worldwide Ltd, 2003

External links
 

1987 British television series debuts
1988 British television series endings
1980s British sitcoms
ITV sitcoms
Television series by ITV Studios
Television series by Yorkshire Television
English-language television shows